Sir Trevor McDonald  (born George McDonald; 16 August 1939) is a Trinidadian-British newsreader and journalist, best known for his career as a news presenter with ITN.

McDonald was knighted in 1999 for his services to journalism.

Career

Early career
Trevor McDonald was born on 16 August 1939 in San Fernando, Trinidad and Tobago, to Josephine and Lawson McDonald. McDonald is of Dougla heritage, his mother being of African descent and his father being of Indian descent.

After working as a print and broadcast journalist in Trinidad during the 1960s, in 1969, McDonald was employed by BBC Radio as a producer, based in London but still broadcasting to the Caribbean. In 1973, he began his long association with Independent Television News as a general reporter and was also ITN's first black reporter. McDonald later became a sports correspondent, but he ultimately concentrated on international politics. In the 1980s, he spent some time with the ITN-produced Channel 4 News, but returned to ITV in 1989, presenting the early-evening news.

News at Ten
McDonald was promoted in 1992 as the sole presenter of News at Ten and became a well-known face on British television screens. McDonald stayed with ITN when News at Ten was axed in 1999, moving to present the new ITV Evening News. News at Ten was briefly relaunched on 22 January 2001, to which McDonald returned as a presenter. He presented the ITV News at 10.30 following News at Tens second axing.

Tonight

From 1999 to 2007, McDonald hosted ITV's flagship current affairs programme Tonight with Trevor McDonald. The show was revived in 2010 with presenter Julie Etchingham.

First retirement

McDonald presented his last ITV News bulletin on 15 December 2005. He stepped down from his role as anchor after more than 30 years at ITN, but said he had no plans to retire completely from television. McDonald told his ITN colleagues that he wanted a low-key departure after having observed the departures of Tom Brokaw and Dan Rather in the United States. At the end of the final programme, he signed off with the words:

Over the closing titles of the last bulletin that McDonald presented, the November 1992 to March 1999 News at Ten theme was played as a tribute to him.

Return to News at Ten

On 31 October 2007, ITV announced that, early in 2008, McDonald would come out of retirement to present the relaunched News at Ten together with Julie Etchingham.

Second retirement

It was announced on 30 October 2008 that McDonald would step down from News at Ten once the 2008 US presidential election was over, to be replaced by Mark Austin. His last bulletin was on 20 November 2008. It was reported at the time that he would continue to present links for  Tonight.

Documentaries

 In 2009, McDonald travelled to the Caribbean and hosted the three-part series The Secret Caribbean with Trevor McDonald for ITV.
 In 2011, McDonald travelled around the Mediterranean and hosted the four-part series The Secret Mediterranean with Trevor McDonald for ITV.
 In 2012, McDonald travelled along the route of the Mississippi River and hosted the three-part series The Mighty Mississippi with Trevor McDonald.
 In 2013, McDonald visited death row inmates in Indiana and hosted the two-part series Inside Death Row.
 In early 2015, McDonald travelled to New York City and hosted the two-part series The Mafia with Trevor McDonald.
 In late 2015, McDonald presented Las Vegas with Trevor McDonald, a two-part series for ITV.
 In September 2016, McDonald presented a two-part series called Inside Scotland Yard With Trevor McDonald for ITV.
 In February 2017, McDonald presented two-part documentary Mafia Women with Trevor McDonald for ITV.
 In late 2017, McDonald presented a documentary called An Hour to Catch a Killer for ITV.
 In February 2018, McDonald presented Death Row 2018 with Trevor McDonald for ITV.
 In February 2018, McDonald presented James Bulger: A Mother's Story with Trevor McDonald for ITV.
 In September 2018, McDonald presented To Catch a Serial Killer with Trevor McDonald for ITV.
 In February 2019, McDonald presented Fred & Rose West: The Real Story with Trevor McDonald for ITV.
 In January 2021, McDonald presented a two-part documentary called And Finally… with Trevor McDonald for ITV.
 In May 2021, McDonald co-presented a documentary called Trevor McDonald & Charlene White: Has George Floyd Changed Britain? for ITV.
 McDonald presented the ITV documentary The Killing of PC Harper: A Wife’s Story on the 17th of March 2022

Other work and media appearances

 In 1996, McDonald presented the "Hogmanay at the Palace"
 McDonald presented the TV series Undercover Customs, which created reconstructions of major HM Customs and Excise investigations in the UK.
 On 21 April 2006, McDonald presented an episode of Have I Got News for You; he delivered a number of autocue jokes, some of which were extremely risqué, in his usual somber newscaster manner, the juxtaposition of which prompted team captain Paul Merton, who usually maintains a straight face on the show, to laugh heartily in disbelief on numerous occasions. It was McDonald's first appearance in any capacity on the show since 1992.
 McDonald was formerly Chancellor of London South Bank University. He also has intimate ties with King's College School in Wimbledon, a London day school, where he is now a governor.
 McDonald is the author of biographies of the cricketers Viv Richards and Clive Lloyd.
 McDonald has worked as an editor of poetry anthologies, and his autobiography Fortunate Circumstances was published in 1993.
 Lenny Henry's comic character Trevor McDoughnut is a parody of McDonald. McDonald once surprised Henry during a performance of "McDoughnut" on Tiswas by walking into the studio to sit with Henry. McDonald returned to Tiswas on two further occasions. First, a number of weeks after his original surprise appearance, he cropped up during a spoof edition of This Is Your Life to "reminisce" with Lenny Henry about the earlier event. The other appearance occurred during the Tiswas Reunited show (a reunion programme broadcast in June 2007) where McDonald joined Lenny on the sofa once again to look back at the old clips and comment on Henry's impersonation.
 McDonald performed live in Hyde Park in summer 1996 with the Who, as the newsreader in the group's staging of their Quadrophenia.
 In June 2007, McDonald hosted the new ITV version of This Is Your Life, Simon Cowell being the programme's "victim".
 From June to August 2007, McDonald presented the satirical panel show News Knight with Sir Trevor McDonald on ITV1.
In August 2010, McDonald conducted a live on-stage interview with Archbishop Desmond Tutu at Fairfield Halls in Croydon at an event entitled An Audience with Desmond Tutu.
 In 2014, McDonald presented a media training course entitled "Deal with the Media with Sir Trevor McDonald".
 McDonald presented a special edition of Countdown in September 2021 as part of Channel 4's Black To Front Day.
 In 2021, McDonald appeared as the titular character in E4's revival of GamesMaster
 In November 2022, McDonald was a guest presenter on Countdown; part of game show's 40th anniversary.

Awards
McDonald holds honorary degrees from the University of Plymouth and Liverpool John Moores University. He was appointed Knight Bachelor in the Queen's 1999 Birthday Honours for his services to broadcasting and journalism. He was awarded with "Special Recognition" at the National Television Awards in 2003 and with a BAFTA fellowship at the 2011 British Academy Television Awards.

References

External links
 Vision Aid Overseas

Sir Trevor reads final bulletin BBC News, 15 December 2005
Newsworthy career of Sir Trevor BBC News, 15 December 2005
"Sir Trevor McDonald Reveals The Stand Out Moment in His Career | This Morning". YouTube, 23 October 2019.

1939 births
Knights Bachelor
BAFTA fellows
ITN newsreaders and journalists
ITV people
Living people
Officers of the Order of the British Empire
People associated with London South Bank University
British reporters and correspondents
Trinidad and Tobago television personalities
Trinidad and Tobago journalists
Trinidad and Tobago emigrants to the United Kingdom
Trinidad and Tobago knights
Black British television personalities
Trinidad and Tobago people of Grenadian descent
Trinidad and Tobago people of Indian descent
Trinidad and Tobago people of Dougla descent
Presidents of Surrey County Cricket Club
Black British journalists
Deputy Lieutenants of Greater London